Niskowa  is a village in the administrative district of Gmina Chełmiec, within Nowy Sącz County, Lesser Poland Voivodeship, in southern Poland.

The village has a population of 711.

References

Niskowa